Wakulla High School is the only public four year high school located in Wakulla County, Florida, United States. It is part of the Wakulla County Public Schools network. The Florida Department of Education has labeled Wakulla High School as a "School of Excellence" in their school accountability reports for the years 2020 and 2021.

History 
Wakulla High School opened in 1967. It combined (via desegregation) three former schools: Sopchoppy, Shadeville, and Crawfordville High Schools. The first year had 564 students and taught grades 7-12. Prior to the use of the War Eagle mascot, the school were the "rebels".

Career & Technical Education 
Wakulla High School has many vocational training programs incorporated into the normal school day. Many of these programs lead to industry certification. Currently, WHS offers programs in the areas of auto mechanics, digital design, web development, carpentry, culinary arts, television production, welding, the nursing assisting program which is the major focus of the Wakulla High School's Medical Academy and the Engineering Academy. These programs articulate into college or technical education programs at the post-secondary level, if the student chooses to pursue this field.

Electives 

 Art
 AVID
 Band
 Chorus
 Foreign Languages (Spanish and French)
 NJROTC
Theatre

Sports 
As of 2022, Wakulla High offers 17 sports programs, many of which have both JV and varsity teams.

 Baseball
 Basketball (boys and girls)
 Cheerleading
 Cross Country
 Flag Football
 Football
 Golf
 Soccer (boys and girls)
 Softball
 Tennis
 Track & Field
 Volleyball
 Weightlifting (boys and girls)
 Wrestling

Demographics

Students 
Enrollment Demographics (2019-20)

 Total: 1,459
 White: 1,175
 Black: 147
 Hispanic: 52
 Asian: 8
 Native Hawaiian/Pacific Islander: 1
 American Indian/Alaska Native: 3
 Two or more races: 73

Enrollment by grade (2019-20)

 Freshman: 396
 Sophomore: 370
 Junior: 368
 Senior: 325

Enrollment by Gender (2019-20)

 Male: 737
 Female: 722

Teachers 
 Classroom Teachers: 80 (2019-20)

Notable alumni 
 Nigel Bradham, former linebacker for the Florida State Seminoles and Former linebacker for the Philadelphia Eagles (Class of 2008)
 Alvin Hall, author, radio and television host, financial expert
 Sam McGrew, former linebacker for the Florida State Seminoles and Miami Dolphins (Class of 2002)
 Feleipe Franks, quarterback for the Atlanta Falcons (Class of 2016)
 Jordan Franks, tight end for the Cleveland Browns

References

External links 
 Official website
 

High schools in Wakulla County, Florida
Public high schools in Florida